A Marine Wildlife Area is a conservation designation for a marine geographical region of Canada that restricts most human activities on that region. Such areas are established and managed by the Canadian Wildlife Service, a division of Environment Canada. Provisions for their creation are defined in the Canada Wildlife Act.

Nature conservation in Canada
Wildlife conservation in Canada